Masset Sound is a  saltwater inlet on Graham Island, the largest and northernmost of the Haida Gwaii islands of the North Coast of British Columbia, Canada, connecting Masset Inlet in the island's interior with the open sea via Masset Harbour and McIntyre Bay to the Dixon Entrance. It averages  in width and is less than  width in certain spots. The town of Masset is located on the east bank of Masset Sound's northern end.

References

Sounds of British Columbia
Landforms of Haida Gwaii